Yan Zhiyu (born 8 February 1993) is a Chinese footballer who currently plays for Changchun Yatai in the Chinese Super League.

Club career
Yan Zhiyu started his professional football career in 2011 when he was promoted to Hubei Youth's squad for the 2011 China League Two. He transferred to China League One newcomer Hubei China-Kyle in 2013. In January 2014, Yan followed the club move to Urumqi where they changed their name as Xinjiang Tianshan Leopard. On 17 April 2016, he scored his first goal for the club in a 2–0 home win against Shanghai Shenxin.

On 10 February 2018, Yan joined Chinese Super League side Changchun Yatai after a successful trial. On 24 April 2018, he made his debut for the club in the 2018 Chinese FA Cup against third-tier club Sichuan Jiuniu. Despite scoring in the penalty shoot-out, Changchun Yatai finally lost 4–3. He made his Super League debut on 1 August 2018, playing the whole match in a 3–0 home win over Dalian Yifang. On 6 October 2018, he scored his first goal for the club in a 3–3 away draw against Tianjin TEDA.

Career statistics
.

Honours

Club
Changchun Yatai
 China League One: 2020

References

External links
 

1993 births
Living people
Chinese footballers
Footballers from Wuhan
Association football midfielders
Chinese Super League players
China League One players
China League Two players
Xinjiang Tianshan Leopard F.C. players
Changchun Yatai F.C. players
21st-century Chinese people